Kong Svends Høj is a passage grave on the island of Lolland in Denmark, immediately north of Pederstrup.

Description
Kong Svends Høj consists of a large, rectangular mound covering a chamber  in length. The north-western façade originally had two outliers, known as "horns" or guard stones.

The first excavations were attempted in 1780 by a Danish prime minister and a pastor's son who later became bishop of Copenhagen. The tomb was first restored in 1942, when the entrance was discovered. The tomb is thought to date to the middle Neolithic period, circa 3200 BC.

References

External links

Megalithic monuments in Denmark
Listed buildings and structures in Lolland Municipality